is a Japanese crossover superhero film featuring the main characters of Kamen Rider Wizard and Kamen Rider Fourze. It was released in Japan on December 8, 2012, as part of the annual winter "Movie War" franchise.

Plot

Prologue
In 2012, Phantom leader Wiseman sends his subordinates Medusa and Phoenix to assist the Akumaizer – Zatan, Eil, and Gahra – in their plot to use five captive Gates' mana to create an army of monsters to seek revenge against humanity for driving them underground millennia ago. With their forces bolstered, Eil travels five years into the future to retrieve a device necessary for their plans.

Kamen Rider Fourze
In 2017, Interpol agents Ryusei Sakuta and Inga Blink defeat a group of psychic criminals working for Kageto Banba. Meanwhile, astronaut Yuki Jojima is returning to Earth from the International Space Station while her childhood friend and teacher, Gentaro Kisaragi, attempts to help his student Miyoko Ohki maintain the Space Kamen Rider Club, of which she is the only member. One of Kisaragi's students, Saburo Kazeta, and three of the latter's friends cause trouble with their psychic powers. Kisaragi and fellow teacher Haruka Utsugi try to stop Kazeta, who transforms into Sanagiman, receives the Zeber device from Banba to enhance his powers, and overpowers Kisaragi until Sakuta rescues Kisaragi and suggests they reunite the original Kamen Rider Club to help him.

Sometime later, Banba assembles other psychic teenagers to power the Zeber for the Akumaizer, claiming it is part of a crusade to stop space exploration and force Earth's governments to focus on terrestrial problems instead. While Kisaragi and his friends expose Banba and convince most of them to leave, Kazeta and his "Monster League" continue to stand by Banba. As Sakuta battles Banba and Kisaragi's friends subdue the league, Kisaragi confronts Kazeta, who claims it is too late for him because he is a monster. Kisaragi sacrifices his Fourze Driver and convinces Kazeta that he has the power to become someone else. Suddenly, Banba defeats Sakuta and kidnaps Ohki. Kazeta transforms into Inazuman to defeat Banba, but Eil steals the Zeber and damages Jojima's return module before returning to the present. Nadeshiko Misaki rescues Jojima before joining Kisaragi and Sakuta in pursuing Eil through time and borrowing the Fourze Driver from Kisaragi's present self.

Kamen Rider Wizard
In 2012, Haruto Soma destroys several of the Akumaizer's monsters before facing them. They overpower him, escape through a Gate's Underworld after Eil rejoins them, and order Medusa and Phoenix to stop Soma for them. They flee as they do not want to be associated with the Akumaizer. Soma pursues the trio while his friends Shunpei Nara and Rinko Daimon accidentally follow him and leave Koyomi behind. Soma, Nara, and Daimon find themselves in what appears to be their world with no memory of what happened. Everyone around them seems to be focused on preparing a birthday party for someone named Poitrine.

While exploring the streets, Soma finds a group of children being attacked by monsters. While Nara and Daimon get them to safety, Soma confronts the monsters when a young woman named Yu Kamimura arrives and transforms into Belle Mask Poitrine to defeat them. The monsters flee, but Kamimura says they must not be followed as they have abandoned the fight. While the children beg Daimon and Nara to remember the truth, the pair and Soma celebrate Kamimura's birthday. Soma awakens at the start of the day and remembers the truth. When the monsters attack the children again like last time, Soma destroys the monsters before Kamimura arrives. As she and the civilians harass him for doing so, he discovers that he, his friends, and the children are trapped in Kamimura's Underworld, which is connected to the Akumaizer's machine. Soma tries to rescue Kamimura, but Gahra stops him and convinces her to let Soma join her birthday party until Soma and the children bring her to her senses. Freed from the Akumaizer's control, Kamimura joins Soma in fighting Gahra until the other Akumaizer arrive, kidnap her, and send more monsters to stop Soma.

Movie War Ultimatum
As Kisaragi, Sakuta, and Misaki rescue Koyomi from monsters and travel to the Akumaizer's machine, Wiseman reveals to his subordinates that the Akumaizer plan to use the Zeber in an ocean of magic underneath Kamimura's Underworld to generate enough magic to kill humanity. After Koyomi explains the situation, Kisaragi uses a Magic Ring that he received in the past to grant himself and his allies entry into Kamimura's Underworld, arriving in time to save Soma. During the battle, Kisaragi recognizes Soma, but the latter does not reciprocate. Suddenly, the Akumaizer send their army to kill the Riders while they escape with Kamimura and the Zeber. Eiji Hino arrives to protect Koyomi from the machine, use his powers to reach the children, and give them Magic Rings that allow them to summon Kamen Riders OOO, Birth, W, and Accel to aid Soma, Kisaragi, Sakuta, and Misaki.

The eight Riders defeat the army before intercepting the Akumaizer and rescuing Kamimura, destroying Eil and Gahra in the process. Zatan makes a final attempt to fulfill his plans, but Kisaragi and Soma receive a power boost from their allies and destroy him with the Zeber. Returning from the Underworld, Kisaragi asks Soma to return the Fourze Driver to his present self before joining Sakuta and Misaki in returning to their time, where they learn Kazeta and his friends vow to dedicate themselves to fighting those who misuse their psychic powers as the Youth League. While freeing the Gates, Soma and his allies learn the children are unable to remember what happened while Kamimura, who Soma learns is the Doughnut Shop Hungry's effeminate male manager, retains his memories. As Soma returns the Fourze Driver to the present day Kisaragi, he also gives him the Magic Ring that Kisaragi will use in the future.

Cast
 Fourze cast
 : 
 : 
 : 
 : 
 : 
 : 
 : 
 : 
 : 
 : 
 : 
 : 
 : 
 : 
 : 
 : 
 : 
 : 
 : 
  
 Miu's manager: 
 Gang boss: 
 Sports magazine reporter: 
 Announcer: 

 Wizard cast
 : 
 : 
 : 
 : 
 : 
 : 
 : 
 Manager of donut shop: 
 Worker at donut shop: 
 Chief of police: 
 : 
 Young Saburo: 
 Young Rumi: 
 Young Daita: 
 Young Chikao: 
 : 

 Movie War Ultimatum cast
 : 
 : 
 : 
 : 
 : 
 O-Scanner Voice: 
 Gaia Memory Voice:

Theme song
 "FOREST OF ROCKS"
 Lyrics & Composition: H.E. Demon Kakka
 Arrangement: Ai Ishigaki
 Artist:

Reception
The film grossed US$11.7 million in Japan.

References

External links

2012 films
Fourze and OOO: Movie War Ultimatum
Crossover tokusatsu films
Films directed by Koichi Sakamoto
Japanese science fiction horror films
Japanese supernatural horror films
Movie War Ultimatum
Movie
Superhero horror films